The NWA Western States Heritage Championship was a short-lived National Wrestling Alliance title in Jim Crockett Promotions that was filled via a tournament in the Universal Wrestling Federation in 1987, and defended in the NWA until it was abandoned in 1989. The belt was created as a tribute to the NWA Western States Heavyweight Championship based in Amarillo, Texas, despite the fact that it was never actually defended there and that most title defenses happened in Eastern Seaboard and at best the Midwest.

The NWA Western States Heavyweight Championship revived in 2015 by the NWA and Vendetta Pro Wrestling, uses a belt design identical to the belt used for the NWA Western States Heritage Championship, prompting many to refer to it as the "NWA Western States Heritage Championship". The title also credits all former Western States Champions—including the Western States Heritage titleholders—with their reigns as champion.

Reigns

See also
Jim Crockett Promotions
National Wrestling Alliance
Universal Wrestling Federation

References

World Championship Wrestling championships
Jim Crockett Promotions championships
National Wrestling Alliance championships
Universal Wrestling Federation (Bill Watts) championships
Regional professional wrestling championships